Matt Bushman (born November 3, 1995) is an American football tight end for the Kansas City Chiefs of the National Football League (NFL). He played college football at BYU and was undrafted in the 2021 NFL Draft. Bushman also played baseball at BYU in 2017.

College career
Bushman played in 39 games at BYU despite sitting out his senior season due to injury, compiling 125 receptions for 1,719 yards and 9 Touchdowns.

Professional career

Las Vegas Raiders
Bushman was signed as an undrafted free agent by the Las Vegas Raiders after going unselected in the 2021 NFL Draft. Bushman was released on August 31, 2021, but signed to the practice squad the next day. He was released on December 23.

Kansas City Chiefs
On January 4, 2022, Bushman was signed to the Kansas City Chiefs practice squad. He signed a reserve/future contract with the Chiefs on February 2, 2022. Bushman suffered a fractured clavicle in the Chiefs' preseason game against the Green Bay Packers on August 25, 2022, a game in which he recorded 3 receptions for 73 yards and 2 touchdowns prior to being injured. He was waived on August 30, 2022 with an injury designation. After clearing waivers, he was placed on the Chiefs' injured reserve. On September 8, 2022, he was released with an injury settlement. He was re-signed to the practice squad on December 20, 2022. Bushman became a Super Bowl champion when the Chiefs defeated the Philadelphia Eagles in Super Bowl LVII. He signed a reserve/future contract on February 15, 2023.

Personal life
Prior to his college career, Bushman served a two-year mission for the Church of Jesus Christ of Latter-day Saints in Santiago, Chile and speaks fluent Spanish. While at BYU, Bushman married the daughter of former BYU and NFL tight end Chad Lewis.

References

External links
Kansas City Chiefs bio
Las Vegas Raiders bio
BYU Cougars bio

1995 births
Living people
American football tight ends
21st-century Mormon missionaries
BYU Cougars football players
Las Vegas Raiders players
Kansas City Chiefs players
Latter Day Saints from Arizona
Players of American football from Arizona
BYU Cougars baseball players